Thomas Sourice, born 10 February 1984 in Tours (Indre-et-Loire), is a French rugby union player who plays as flanker for RC Toulonnais (1.83 m, 94 kg).

Career 
 1997-2000 : Nice UR, student at Pôle Espoir Rugby of the school at Parc Impérial à Nice
 Since 2000 : RC Toulon

Honours 
 Pro D2 Champions : 2008
 Championnat de France Espoirs Semi-finalists : 2006
 Championnat de France Reichel Finalists : 2005

External links 
  Player profile at lequipe.fr
  Statistics at itsrugby.fr

French rugby union players
Rugby union flankers
1984 births
RC Toulonnais players
Living people
Sportspeople from Tours, France
Provence Rugby players
Rugby Nice Côte d'Azur players